Matthias Bertsch (born 1966 in Lichtenau) is a German-born Austrian musicologist, musician and professor at the University of Music and Performing Arts in Vienna. He is the President of the Austrian Society for Music and Medicine (Musicians Health Care).

Life 
Bertsch grew up in Lichtenau (Germany) next to the Alsacian border and moved to Vienna, Austria in 1988 for his studies in musicology at the University of Vienna. After graduation he received his PhD in 1999 ("summa cum laude") with his work on the trumpet in the fields of "Musical Acoustics" and "Musical Physiology". In 2003 he qualified as a professor with tenure track in musical acoustics and was Deputy Director of the Institute of Musical Acoustics at the University of Music and Performing Arts in Vienna.

In 2008, Bertsch trained as a biofeedback coach and joined the musicians health group at the Music University as scientist in the field of music physiology. In 2009 he was elected as president of the Austrian Society for Music and Medicine (music medicine, music physiology, psychology of music).
Besides his academic career, he began to play trumpet at the age of 7, and continued his education through private studies with Györky Ottlakan, Manfred Stoppacher and masterclasses with Fred Mills and Thomas Gansch.

Musicology and scientific research 
His interdisciplinary music research is focused toward empirical and data-oriented methods in the area of psychology, acoustics, organology, psychoacoustics, physiology and cognitive science. He has authored books, articles, in print and online media and scientific contributions in TV broadcasts in Austria (ORF) and Germany.

Artistic activity 
As a trumpeter, he performed within philharmonic Orchestra, Big Bands and brass quintets. As part of his military service in Stabsmusikkorps Bundeswehr, he played with at state receptions (e.g. for Ronald Reagan and the only official reception of Erich Honecker in 1987).

References

External links 
 
 University of Music and Performing Arts, Vienna
 Researchgate Publications
 Dr. Trumpet's Brass Research Review on Youtube

1966 births
Living people
German musicologists
People from Mödling
Austrian musicologists